The Women's Defence Groups (Italian: Gruppi di difesa della donna) were a multi-party organisation of women active during the Italian Resistance. The groups were formed in Milan in November 1943 as part of an initiative by the Italian Communist Party. 

Collectively known by their full name "Defence Groups for Women and for the Assistance of Freedom Fighters" they had a double objective: active participation in the fight against the fascist regime as well as the emancipation of women.

History 

The groups were launched as a result of a meeting between women of different political backgrounds. These included communists Giovanna Barcellona, Lina Fibbi and Caterina Picolato; socialists Laura Conti and Lina Merlin; actionists (social democrats) Elena Dreher and Ada Gobetti; and women active in the Giustizia e Libertà (Justice and Freedom) movement. Republican and Catholic women were also involved, as were women with no previous political or ideological commitments. The groups spread mainly in the northern midlands. Some scholars attribute this to the clothing typically worn by Italian women in that area, which was said to make women more ready to act on their own and to have greater civic awareness.

Initially the intention was for the women in the groups to play supporting roles in resistance efforts.  It was not long, though, before they began to take on leadership roles in the areas of information distribution, propaganda, orders, and ammunition activities. Some women also participated as "gappistas", directly taking up arms.  Ada Gobetti was one of the first to criticize the use of the word "assistance" in the name of the groups. In 1944, a formulation of the organization's goals that was more geared to activities that broadly speaking fostered the emancipation of women took shape.

In Turin, the GDG were primarily organized in factories in groups of about ten workers. They met in private homes and were given practical instructions on topics including how to carry out factory sabotage, typing, telegraphy and first aid. A women's newspaper was published. It was called "Noi Donne" (Our women) after the title used in the Spanish and Paris wars in 1937.

In Milan, the groups were organized by Irma Brambilla, Iole Radice, and Lidia Salvano. The meetings were always held in different places, in the interest of avoiding detection, and almost always on Sunday morning. Impromptu rallies in the factories came about when a young woman from one area went, during her lunch break, to a factory where some companions had already been notified that a rally would occur. There, she would lead a rally in the shortest time possible and then disappear.

Movies and documentaries 

In 2016, a documentary film Nome di battaglia Donna (Battle name: Woman) directed by Daniele Segre was released. It showcased stories of several of the surviving WDG activists from the Piedmont region.

Notes

References

External links 
 Gruppi di difesa della donna (Groups for women's defense), on www.anpi.it. URL consulted on 23 March 2015.
 Conference proceedings and results of research on GDD promoted by the National ANPI:  http://www.anpi.it/articoli/1869/i-gruppi-di-difesa-della-donna-pubblicati-gli-atti-del-convegno-anpi-e-i-risultati-della-ricerca

Italian resistance movement
Anti-fascist organisations in Italy